Camera is a 2014 Hong Kong-Singaporean science fiction thriller directed by James Leong and co-written by Ben Slater and Leong.  It stars Sean Li as a surveillance expert who falls in love with his newest target, played by Venus Wong.  It premiered at the 2014 Bucheon International Fantastic Film Festival.  It is Leong's first narrative film.

Plot 
In near-future Hong Kong, Ming receives a cybernetic eye to replace his biological eye, which went blind in his childhood.  He uses this replacement to record everything he sees.  On his latest surveillance job, he falls in love the subject, a woman named Clare.

Cast 
 Sean Li as Ming
 Venus Wong as Clare
 Calvin Poon as Dr. Chan

Po-Chih Leong, director James Leong's father, appears in a cameo as Ming's father.

Production 
Prior to production, Leong received funding from the Network of Asian Fantastic Films in the form of the Puchon award.  Shooting took place during January and February 2012 in Hong Kong.

Release 
Camera premiered at the Bucheon International Fantastic Film Festival on 19 July 2014.

Reception 
Richard Kuipers of Variety wrote that the film fails to live up to its premise and does not expand enough on Hong Kong's futuristic timeline, though he said it "never becomes dull".  Bérénice Reynaud of Senses of Cinema criticized the Variety review, saying that it missed out on how the film addresses surveillance issues in modern Hong Kong.  Clarence Tsui of The Hollywood Reporter wrote, "Beauty thrives but also distracts the director from his aspirations of fusing fiction with social commentary."  James March of Twitch Film wrote that the film "showcases the director's strong visual sensibility", but the dull screenplay causes it to fail to live up to its "intriguing premise".

References

External links 
 
 

2014 films
2010s science fiction thriller films
Hong Kong science fiction films
Hong Kong thriller films
Singaporean science fiction films
2010s Cantonese-language films
Films about security and surveillance
Films set in Hong Kong
Films set in the future
Films shot in Hong Kong
Hong Kong neo-noir films
Singaporean thriller films
2010s Hong Kong films